The 1918 Massachusetts Aggies football team was to represent Massachusetts Agricultural College in the 1918 college football season. The Aggies did not field an official varsity football team during this season, as most able-bodied men of college age were serving in the U.S. Armed Forces during World War I.

References

Massachusetts
UMass Minutemen football seasons
Massachusetts Aggies football